High Roller is a ,  diameter giant Ferris wheel on the Las Vegas Strip in Paradise, Nevada, United States. Owned and operated by Caesars Entertainment, it opened to the public on March 31, 2014 as the world's tallest Ferris wheel. It is  taller than the  Singapore Flyer, which had held the record since 2008. Since October 2021 it is the world's second tallest Ferris wheel after Ain Dubai.

Design
High Roller was announced in August 2011 as the centerpiece of Caesars Entertainment Corporation's $550 million The LINQ. Arup Engineering, which previously consulted on the Singapore Flyer, acted as the structural engineer.

The passenger cabins (or capsules) are mounted on the wheel's outboard rim and are individually rotated by electric motors to smoothly maintain a horizontal cabin floor throughout each full rotation. Preliminary designs anticipated 32 passenger cabins, each with a 40-passenger capacity —with the final design accommodating 28 40-person cabins and a total capacity of 1,120 passengers.

At night the wheel is illuminated by a 2,000-LED system which can display a single solid color, differently colored sections, multiple colors moving around the rim, and custom displays for special events and holidays.

Construction
Located on Las Vegas Boulevard, across from Caesars Palace, construction was originally scheduled to begin in September 2011 with a late 2013 completion; subsequently revised to early 2014.

The outer rim of the wheel was completed on September 9, 2013. The first passenger cabin was delivered and installed in November 2013 and the final cabin was installed the following month. After preliminary testing, High Roller's lighting system was illuminated at sunset on February 28, 2014. High Roller opened to the public at 4 p.m. EST on March 31, 2014.

Ticketing
Tickets were originally expected to cost less than $20 per ride, but estimates had risen to "about $25 per person" by mid-2012 then "about $30 per person" in September 2013 news reports.

When High Roller opened to the public in March 2014, tickets for a single 30-minute ride, the time taken for the entire wheel to rotate once, cost $24.95 (daytime) and $34.95 (nighttime). Other ticket options included a $59.95 Express Pass, allowing the holder to skip the line and ride any time.

Successor as world's tallest
The Ain Dubai in the United Arab Emirates opened on October 21, 2021. Construction eventually began almost two years behind schedule in May 2015. Erection of the main support structure was completed in 2016.

Further delays pushed the target opening to 2021, coinciding with Expo 2020.

Gallery

See also
 High Roller, a former roller coaster atop the Stratosphere Las Vegas tower
 Voyager, a giant Ferris wheel proposed several times for Las Vegas, but never built
 List of tallest buildings and structures in the world

References

External links

 
 Caesars Sees Slow Climb for Ferris Wheel on the Las Vegas Strip

2014 establishments in Nevada
Amusement rides introduced in 2014
Buildings and structures in Paradise, Nevada
Ferris wheels in the United States
Las Vegas Strip
Tourist attractions in the Las Vegas Valley